North Dakota Highway 26 (ND 26) is a  east–west state highway in the U.S. state of North Dakota. ND 26's western terminus is at ND 1 in Dazey, and the eastern terminus is at ND 32 in Pillsbury.

Major intersections

References

026
Transportation in Barnes County, North Dakota